Triple threat or Triple Threat may refer to:

Media and performing arts
 Triple threat (entertainer), a performer who excels at acting, singing, and dancing
 Triple Threat (1948 film), a 1948 Hollywood film
 Triple Threat (2019 film), a 2019 thriller film
 Triple Threat (game show), a television show that aired in 1988 and 1992
 "Triple Threat" (CSI: Miami)
 "Triple Threat" (My Little Pony: Friendship is Magic)

Music
 Triple Threat (Roland Kirk album), 1957
 Triple Threat (Jimmy Heath album), 1962
 Triple Threat (Annihilator album)
 "Triple Threat" (Missy Elliott song), released in 2012
 "Triple Threat" (Rick Tippe song), released in 1999

Sports
 Triple threat position (basketball), in which a player has the options of shooting, dribbling, or passing 
 Triple-threat man (gridiron football), a player who excels at running, passing, and kicking

Wrestling
 The Triple Threat, a professional wrestling faction in Extreme Championship Wrestling from 1995 to 1998
 Triple threat match, a professional wrestling match involving three wrestlers

Other
 Chiappa Triple Threat are Italian made triple-barrel shotguns.